Sunny Corner, New Brunswick is a rural settlement in Northumberland County, New Brunswick, Canada. It is located approximately 35 km west of Miramichi, New Brunswick, on the northeast bank of the Northwest Miramichi River, opposite, Red Bank.  The community has an Irving gas station, a Royal Canadian Legion, a Lions Club, a police station serviced by the RCMP, a volunteer fire department, a hockey rink, and a seniors home.

The local service district of Sunny Corner takes its name from the community. In 2022 the community, including the whole local service district, was amalgamated into the Miramichi River Valley municipality.

Education
The community has both an elementary school (North & South Esk Elementary) and a high school (North & South Esk Regional).

History

Arena
The community's hockey arena is located at 32 North West Road Sunny Corner, NB. Right between the NSEE school and NSER school.

See also
List of communities in New Brunswick

References

Communities in Northumberland County, New Brunswick
Designated places in New Brunswick
Local service districts of Northumberland County, New Brunswick